Taounate is a province in the Fès-Meknès region. It is situated in northern Morocco, north-east of Fes. It had a population of 668,232 in the 2004 Census.

Largest towns
Taounate (32,380 inhabitants)
Bouhouda (26,124)
Tamedit (21,453)
Mkansa (22,705)
Aïn Aïcha (22,575)
Galaz (18,471)
Ghouazi (18,779)
Sidi M'Hamed Ben Lahcen (18,990)
Jbabra (19,076)
Bouarouss (18,495)
Moulay Bouchta (16,602)
Aïn Médiouna (16,410)
Ras el Oued (15,949)
Bouchabel (16,652)
Loulja (16,515)
Ourtzagh (15,216)
Broumiyene
Beni Kourrab
Bou Adel
Ain Mlallou
Ain Jnane

Subdivisions
The province is divided administratively into the following:

References

 
Taounate Province